The South Dakota Coyotes men's basketball team represents the University of South Dakota in NCAA Division I basketball. They are currently members of the Summit League. They are led by head coach Eric Peterson and play their home games at the Sanford Coyote Sports Center. Prior to joining Division I beginning with the 2008–09 season, the Coyotes were members of NCAA Division II in the North Central Conference. They were Division II National Champions in 1958.

Record year-by-year

Postseason

NCAA Division II Tournament results
The Coyotes have appeared in 13 NCAA Division II Tournaments. Their combined record is 17–12. The Coyotes won the NCAA Division II National Championship in 1958.

† - Jackson State, citing policy of the Mississippi Board of Trustees, was compelled to withdraw from the Tournament rather than competing in an interracial contest. This would be the only time such an occurrence would directly mar the tournament, and Jackson State themselves would return to the Tournament in 1964.

NAIA Tournament results
The Coyotes have appeared in one NAIA tournament. Their record is 0–1.

NIT results
The Coyotes have appeared in one National Invitation Tournament (NIT). Their record is 0–1.

CIT results
The Coyotes have appeared in one CollegeInsider.com Postseason Tournament (CIT). Their record is 0–1.

CBI results
The Coyotes have appeared in the College Basketball Invitational (CBI) one time. Their record is 0–1.

Draft history
1 total NBA draft pick.

Regular Draft

References

External links
 

 
Basketball teams established in 1908
1908 establishments in South Dakota